Enio Girolami (14 January 1935 – 16 February 2013), sometimes credited as Thomas Moore, was an Italian film and television actor.

Born in Rome, son of director Marino Girolami and brother of director Enzo G. Castellari, Girolami made his film debut at 18 with a role of weight in Fratelli d'Italia by Fausto Saraceni. He then appeared in many films, sometimes as main actor, working among others with Alberto Lattuada, Federico Fellini, Mauro Bolognini and Giuseppe De Santis. From 1960 he worked almost exclusively with his father and brother.

Selected filmography

 Brothers of Italy (1952) - Sergio
 Poppy (1952) - Marocchi
 Il viale della speranza (1953) - Piazzoni (uncredited)
 Ci troviamo in galleria (1953) - Uno spettatore intransigente
 The Beach (1954) - Riccardo
 Il seduttore (1954) - The Singer with a Guitar in the Restaurant (uncredited)
 Ho ritrovato mio figlio (1954) - Marco
 Loves of Three Queens (1954) - Minor Role (uncredited)
 Ultima illusione (1954)
 Il cantante misterioso (1955) - Paolo
 Ore 10: lezione di canto (1955) - Ennio - uno dei Five Jolly
 Faccia da mascalzone (1956)
 Il suo più grande amore (1956) - Giangiacomo - il figlio di Rita
 I miliardari (1956) - Pinella
 Nights of Cabiria (1957) - Amleto, 'il magnaccia'
 Sette canzoni per sette sorelle (1957) - Luigi
 Marisa (1957) - Soldier
 C'è un sentiero nel cielo (1957) - Emilio Hernandez
 Vacanze a Ischia (1957) - Furio
 Young Husbands (1958) - Franco Marchetti
 Si le roi savait ça (1958)
 Quando gli angeli piangono (1958) - Ennio
 Girls for the Summer (1958) - Walter
 I ragazzi dei Parioli (1959) - Fabrizio
 Quel tesoro di papà (1959) - Franco
 Le notti dei Teddy Boys (1959) - Nino
 Quanto sei bella Roma (1959) - Carlo
 Spavaldi e innamorati (1959) - Romano
 Il principe fusto (1960) - Amico di Ettore
 Caccia al marito (1960) - Claudio Massa - Giulia's fiancé
 La garçonnière (1960) - Alvaro
 Ferragosto in bikini (1960) - Dario
 La ragazza sotto il lenzuolo (1961) - Gianni - the barman (uncredited)
 Bellezze sulla spiaggia (1961) - Franco
 Le magnifiche 7 (1961) - Marco
 Un figlio d'oggi (1961) - Renzo
 The Fury of Achilles (1962) - Patroclus
 Gli italiani e le donne (1962) - Nando (segment "I Galli del Colosseo")
 Twist, lolite e vitelloni (1962) - Vittorio Emmanuele
 L'assassino si chiama Pompeo (1962) - Carlo Landi 
 The Shortest Day (1963) - Soldato (uncredited)
 Le motorizzate (1963) - Activist of Communist Party (segment "Carmelitane Sprint")
 Siamo tutti pomicioni (1963) - Ennio (segment "Colonnello e signora")
 Jacob and Esau (1963) - Esaù giovane - Young Esau
 Cleopazza (1964)
 Queste pazze pazze donne (1964) - Nando ('Il gentil sesso')
 Bullets and the Flesh (1964) - Sam Masters
 Veneri in collegio (1965)
 Veneri al sole (1965) - Mario Giorgetti (segment "Intrigo al mare")
 Spiaggia libera (1966) - Ciccio
 A Few Dollars for Django (1966) - Sam Lister
 The Hellbenders (1967) - Lieutenant Soublette
 Da Berlino l'apocalisse (1967) - (scenes deleted)
 Renegade Riders (1967) - Chamaco Gonzales
 A Ghentar si muore facile (1967) - Kim
 Due rrringos nel Texas (1967) - Bruce
 Johnny Hamlet (1968) - Ross
 One Dollar Too Many (1968) - Stagecoach Guard (uncredited)
 Between God, the Devil and a Winchester (1968) - Marco Serraldo
 I 2 magnifici fresconi (1969) - Berti - Police Commissioner
 Don Franco e Don Ciccio nell'anno della contestazione (1969) - Tenente dei Carabinieri
 Reverend's Colt (1970) - Mestizo
 Las amantes del diablo (1971) - Dr. Carlos Ferrer
 Decameron proibitissimo (Boccaccio mio statte zitto) (1972) - Rinaldo
 Maria Rosa la guardona (1973)
 Roma, l'altra faccia della violenza (1976) - Commissario Ferreri
 Day of the Cobra (1980) - Martino
 Great White (1981) - Matt Rosen
 Giggi il bullo (1982) - Discotheque manager
 Tenebrae (1982) - Department Store Manager
 1990: The Bronx Warriors (1982) - Samuel Fisher
 The New Barbarians (1983) - Shadow
 Escape from the Bronx (1983) - President Henry Clark
 Tuareg – The Desert Warrior (1984)
 Light Blast (1985) - Dr. Yuri Soboda
 Operation Nam (1986)
 Sinbad of the Seven Seas (1989) - Viking
 Killer Crocodile (1989) - Joe
 Killer Crocodile 2 (1990) - Joe
 Jonathan of the Bears (1994) - Goodwin's Mercenary
 Li chiamarono... briganti! (1999)
 Maximum Velocity (V-Max) (2002) - Padre di Stefano

References

External links 
 

Italian male film actors
1935 births
2013 deaths
Male actors from Rome
Italian male television actors
Male Spaghetti Western actors
20th-century Italian male actors